Inventaire is the name given to the debut album of the French singer Christophe Willem. It was released on April 16, 2007 and was supported by the two hit singles "Double Je" and "Jacques a dit", which were top five hits in France and Belgium. The album was mainly composed by the French artists Zazie and Philippe Katerine.

It was the third more successful album of 2007 in France, and a huge success in francophone countries, with about 1 million copies sold. "Double Je" topped the French charts and was awarded the Victoire de la Musique for Song of the Year, while Willem won Best French Revelation of the Year. The album itself won Francophone Album of the Year at the 2008 NRJ Music Awards.

An acoustic version of the album was released, which also included the track "Sunny" and a cover of The Cranberries track "Zombie".

Track listing

Track listing - Tout En Acoustic

 "Élu Produit de l'année"
 "Quelle chance"
 "Jacques a dit"
 "Le Lycée"
 "Sunny"
 "Bombe anatomique"
 "Zombie"
 "Chambre avec vue"
 "Des Nues"
 "Safe Text"
 "Double Je"
 "Kiss the Bride"

Personnel 
 Christophe Willem - lead and backing vocals
 Zazie - backing vocals in "Jacques a dit", "Quelle Chance", "Double Je (Remix)", "Safe Text", "Bombe Anatomique", "Double Je (Original)", and "Jacques a dit (Remix)"
 Valérie Lemercier - co-lead vocals in "Pourquoi tu t'en vas?"
 Philippe Katerine - backing vocals in "La Tortue"

Charts

Certifications

References

2007 debut albums
Christophe Willem albums
Sony BMG albums